Ryan Little (born 28 March 1971) is a Canadian film director, cinematographer and producer.  He is perhaps best known for his 2003 film Saints and Soldiers. His work has a broad range of genres including war films and children's subjects. Little was born in Vancouver, British Columbia, Canada and graduated from Brigham Young University in 1999. He has produced six films, directed eleven and written one.

Early life 
Born in Vancouver, Little always had an aspiration for making film. Growing up, his father made 8 mm films and was always eager to show them off to him. With this, a passion for film began and Little knew that when he grew up he wanted to make films.

It took Little three tries to get into Brigham Young University and two more applications for an acceptance into the film program. Little is a Mormon. While at BYU, he made over twenty short films.

Professional career 
The idea for his first professional film Saints and Soldiers was inspired by his religion professor at Brigham Young, Dennis A. Wright. Wright was the coauthor of a book Saints at War, and he shared some stories with Little that he wished could have been in the book but had to be left out. Little was able to contact the veterans that Wright told him about and with their help, he wrote the story of Saints and Soldiers. The film, which takes place during World War II, is about three soldiers who escape during the Malmedy massacre.

One key element found in most of Little's work is the portraying of religious people as not completely perfect and secular people as not completely evil. For example, in Saints and Soldiers some German characters were depicted as good people even though they were Nazis.

Some of Little's other work includes the ABC Family Channel original comedy Everything You Want, Forever Strong (a film about the Highland Rugby Team), Age of the Dragons, and the TNT pilot Blank Slate.

Little's Saints and Soldiers was filmed around the Sundance ski resort. It was entered into seventeen film festivals and won several awards.

Little is one of three executive producers of the BYUtv production extinct along with Orson Scott Card and Aaron Johnston. He is also the director of photography.

Personal life 
Little is married to Lynnita Little and has two sons.

Awards and nominations

Filmography

Directing
The Last Good War (1999)
 Out of Step (2002)
Freedom on the Water (2002 short)
Saints and Soldiers (2003)
Everything You Want (2005) (TV)
Outlaw Trail: The Treasure of Butch Cassidy (2006)
House of Fears (2007)
Forever Strong (2008)
Age of the Dragons (2011)
Saints and Soldiers: Airborne Creed (2012)
Saints and Soldiers: The Void (2014)
War Pigs (2015)
Extinct (2017)

Producing
The Last Good War (1999) (producer)
The Wrong Brother (2000) (producer)
Saints and Soldiers (2003) (producer)
Outlaw Trail: The Treasure of Butch Cassidy (2006) (producer)
House of Fears (2007) (executive producer)
Forever Strong (2008) (producer)
Saints and Soldiers: Airborne Creed (2012)
Saints and Soldiers: The Void (2014)

Cinematography
The Singles Ward (2002)
Freedom on the Water (2002)
The RM (2003)
Saints and Soldiers (2003)
The Home Teachers (2004)
Believe (2007)
Blank Slate (2008) (TV)
Saints and Soldiers: Airborne Creed (2012)
Saints and Soldiers: The Void (2014)

References

External links
 
 
 

Living people
1971 births
American film directors
American cinematographers
American film producers
Film directors from Vancouver
Latter Day Saint artists